Mary Tudor (German: Maria Tudor) is a 1920 German silent historical film directed by Adolf Gärtner and starring Ellen Richter, Hans Adalbert Schlettow and Hanni Reinwald. It is based on the play Marie Tudor by Victor Hugo. In 1922 it was given an American release under the title Judgement.

The film's sets were designed by the art director Willi Wolff.

Cast
 Ellen Richter as Maria Tudor
 Hans Adalbert Schlettow as Fabiano Fabiani 
 Hanni Reinwald as Jane 
 Eduard von Winterstein as Simon Renard 
 Friedrich Wilhelm Kaiser as Jeweller 
 Carl Neisser

References

Bibliography
 Sue Parrill & William B. Robison. The Tudors on Film and Television. McFarland, 2013.

External links

1920 films
Films of the Weimar Republic
Films directed by Adolf Gärtner
German silent feature films
1920s historical films
German historical films
German films based on plays
Films set in London
Films set in the 1550s
Films based on works by Victor Hugo
Cultural depictions of Mary I of England
German black-and-white films
1920s German films